Monosaulax is an extinct genus of beaver-grouped rodents. It is sometimes treated as a synonym of Eucastor (McKenna and Bell, 1997).

References

 McKenna, Malcolm C., and Bell, Susan K. 1997. Classification of Mammals Above the Species Level. Columbia University Press, New York, 631 pp. 

Prehistoric beavers